Surviving the Quiet is the debut album by the British band Seafood, following 1998's singles compilation Messenger in the Camp. The album was released in 2000.

Critical reception
Kerrang! wrote: "'Folksong Crisis' is a sweet-and-sour sing-along that rides its hooks like Sonic Youth thrashing it out with Sleater-Kinney; and the more subdued numbers showcased a young band reaching a kind of creative maturity that’d feed into a very good follow-up, 2001’s When Do We Start Fighting..." The Times deemed it a "crackling bolt of sonic electricity." The Independent thought that the band's "repertoire sounds like a reprise of much of the best of the 1990s American alternative scene ... But the guys carry it off."

Track listing
All songs written by Seafood.

"Guntrip" – 2:35
"Easy Path" – 3:12
"Belt" – 5:23
"Dear Leap The Ride" – 2:54
"This Is Not An Exit" – 3:43
"Led By Bison" – 4:29
"Toggle" – 6:02
"Beware Design" – 2:06
"Folksong Crisis" – 4:32
"fscII/The Quiet" – 10:51

Personnel
David Line – Vocals, guitars
Charles Macleod – Guitars
Kevin Hendrik – Bass, vocals
Caroline Banks – Drums, vocals
Melvin Duffy – Pedal steel guitar on "Dear Leap The Ride" and "Toggle"
Sarah Measures – Flute on "Folksong Crisis" and "fscII/The Quiet"
Leo – Cello on "Beware Design"

References

2000 debut albums
Seafood (band) albums
Fierce Panda Records albums